The 2019 Omloop Het Nieuwsblad was a road cycling one-day race that took place on 2 March 2019 in Belgium. It was the 74th edition of the Omloop Het Nieuwsblad and the fourth event of the 2019 UCI World Tour. It was won by Zdeněk Štybar.

Result

References

External links
 

2019 UCI World Tour
2019 in Belgian sport
2019
March 2019 sports events in Belgium